Featherbed may refer to:
 A type of mattress topper filled with feathers and/or down; see bed base for history.
 A featherbed bog, a type of peatland forming in particular conditions.
 The featherbed frame, a type of motorcycle frame originally designed for performance racing, named for the improvements in comfort it was felt to provide.
 Featherbedding, the practice of hiring more workers than necessary to do a job.
 Featherbed Moss, a hill in England's Peak District.
 Featherbed Top, another hill in England's Peak District.
 Featherbed Alley Printshop, a printing museum in St George's, Bermuda.